Barbarea stricta, the small-flowered winter-cress, is a species of plant in the family Brassicaceae.

Description
Barbarea stricta is a biennial or perennial herb up to 100 cm tall. Leaves are  up to 7 cm long, pinnately lobed with 1–3 pairs of lobes. Flowers are yellow, up to 10 mm across. Fruits are cylindrical or sometimes square in cross section.

Distribution
first described in 1822 from Podolia, what is now the western part of Ukraine. It is native to Europe and Asia  but widely naturalized in parts of North America. It has been reported from all 6 New England states plus Québec, Ontario, New York State, Michigan, Wisconsin, Colorado, Ukraine, Moldova, Romania, China, Greenland, Kazakhstan, Mongolia, Russia, Turkey, France, England, Scotland, Wales, Germany, Denmark, Norway, Sweden, Finland, Poland, Italy, Czech Republic, Austria, Slovakia, Estonia, Lithuania, Latvia, Belarus, Hungary, Croatia and Bosnia-Hercegovina. It grows on disturbed sites such as roadsides, ditches, cultivated fields, etc.

References

External links
 
 

stricta
Flora of Russia
Flora of China
Flora of Mongolia
Flora of Europe
Flora of Kazakhstan